Tin Shed Garden Cafe, or simply Tin Shed, is a restaurant in Portland, Oregon's King neighborhood, in the United States.

Description
Tin Shed Garden Cafe is a dog-friendly restaurant on Alberta Street in northeast Portland's King neighborhood. The cafe has an outdoor dining area and a menu for dogs. Tin Shed hosts Doggie Love Night on Tuesdays, as of 2018. The cafe uses compostable packaging and utensils, as of 2020.

History
Guy Fieri visited Tin Shed for an episode of the Food Network's Diners, Drive-Ins and Dives.

The restaurant is owned by Christie Griffin, as of 2020. In 2020, Tin Shed was forced to close temporarily during the COVID-19 pandemic, but reopened with patio service by early September.

Reception
In 2019, The Oregonian Molly Harbarger and Michael Russell included Tin Shed in an "ultimate guide to Portland's 40 best brunches", and Eater Portland Carrie Uffindell included the cafe in a list of "Primo Kid-Friendly Restaurants in Portland". In 2020, Willamette Week readers ranked the cafe second place in the "Best Brunch Spot" category of the annual "Best of Portland Readers' Poll", and Eater Portland Brooke Jackson-Glidden and Michelle DeVona recommended the "stack" with scrambled eggs and grits or potato cakes and mushroom gravy in their overview of "where to eat and drink on Alberta".

See also
 List of Diners, Drive-Ins and Dives episodes

References

External links

 
 
 Tin Shed Garden Cafe at Zagat

King, Portland, Oregon
Restaurants in Portland, Oregon
Year of establishment missing